California is the most populous U.S. state; as a result, it has the most representation in the United States House of Representatives, with 52 Representatives. Each Representative represents one congressional district.

Per the 2020 United States census, California will lose a new congressional seat, reducing its total seats from 53 to 52. This marked the first time in the state's history where it will lose a seat.

Court ordered districts (1992)
The 1990 census gave California seven additional congressional seats. Legislative attempts to draw new districts failed, as Republican governor Pete Wilson vetoed all three plans made by the Democrat-controlled state legislature. In September 1991, the Supreme Court of California took over the redistricting process to break the stalemate and, under its direction, a panel of retired judges determined the boundaries of the new districts.

Bipartisan redistricting (2002)

After the 2000 census, the California State Legislature was obliged to complete redistricting for House of Representatives districts (in accordance with Article 1, Section 4 of the United States Constitution) as well as California State Assembly and California State Senate districts. It was mutually decided by legislators that the status quo in terms of balance of power would be preserved - a so-called Incumbent Protection Plan. A bipartisan gerrymandering effort was done, and districts were configured in such a way that they were dominated by one or the other party, with few districts that could be considered competitive. In some cases this resulted in extremely convoluted boundary lines.

In the 2004 elections, a win by less than 55 percent of the vote was quite rare. This was seen in only five out of 80 State Assembly seats and two out of 20 State Senate seats up for election. The congressional seats were even less competitive than the state legislative districts - just three of the 53 districts were won with less than 60 percent of the vote in 2004.

Citizens Redistricting Commission

2012
Proposition 11, a California ballot proposition known as the Voters FIRST Act, was approved by the voters on November 4, 2008. It removed from the California Legislature the responsibility for drawing the state's congressional districts, and gave the responsibility instead to a 14-member Citizens Commission.  The U.S. Supreme Court upheld the constitutionality of removing the responsibility from the legislature.  The proposition also required that the districts drawn up (1) comply with the federal Voting Rights Act; (2) make districts contiguous; (3) respect, to the extent possible, the integrity of cities, counties, neighborhoods and "communities of interest"; and (4) to the extent possible, make districts compact. Several of these terms are not defined in law.

Governor Arnold Schwarzenegger had earlier proposed placing the redistricting process in the hands of retired judges, which was on the November ballot as an initiative in a special election (called by the Governor on June 14, 2005), Proposition 77.  The special election was held on November 8, 2005. However, the initiative was overwhelmingly defeated, with 59 percent voting no. All initiatives, including those proposed by the Governor's allies and several independent initiatives, failed that year.

The California Citizens Redistricting Commission certified final district maps on August 15, 2011, and they took effect with the 2012 election. The new districts are described as more "purple" than "red" or "blue" - that is, more mixed in electoral composition compared to the mostly "safe" districts of the previous decade, where incumbents were almost guaranteed re-election. These new districts, combined with demographic trends over several decades that favored the Democratic party, resulted in a gain of four House of Representatives seats for California Democrats in the 2012 elections.

2022

Selection process
The 14-member Commission for 2020 is made up of five Republicans, five Democrats, and four members who are not affiliated with either party. Initial and supplemental applications were forwarded to a review panel consisting of three independent auditors from the CA State Auditor. This panel selected 120 of the "most qualified applicants", who were then personally interviewed and divided into three equal sub-pools according to party affiliation, and then narrowed down to 60 applicants.

The review panel presented those 60 applicants to the California State Legislature, where leadership had the option of removing up to 24 names from the list, eight from each sub-pool. The names of the remaining applicants were submitted to the California State Auditor, who randomly drew three Democrats, three Republicans, and two from neither of those parties. These eight individuals became the first eight members of the commission, and they selected the remaining six members by selecting two commissioners from each of the three sub-pools.

Redistricting process
The commission received the official 2020 U.S. census data on which the maps must be based, by law, on September 21, 2021. Draft maps were released then on November 21, and final maps were submitted to the California Secretary of State on December 27, 2021.

The new districts are considered "enacted" as of December 27, 2021. However, there was a 90-day period for a referendum petition to be filed to prevent the maps from becoming effective. This referendum period ended on March 27, 2022, when the filing and campaign season for the 2022 primary election was already underway. Even after becoming effective, the newly redrawn districts did not become official until the 2022 primary and general elections, and the new districts did not actually exist until after the 2022 general election was complete. Starting from the 2023 inaugurations, the existing boundaries and elected representatives are as shown below.

Current districts and representatives
List of members of the United States House delegation from California, their terms in office, district boundaries, and their political ratings according to the CPVI. The delegation for the 118th Congress had a total of 52 members, with 40 Democrats and 12 Republicans.

Historical district boundaries

See also

 Districts in California
 List of United States congressional districts

Notes

References